Filip Salaquarda (born January 11, 1984 in Prague) is a professional racing driver from the Czech Republic.

Career

Early career
After an early career in karting, Salaquarda began his racing career in 2000 in his native Czech Republic, competing in the Ford Puma Cup where he finished in third place. A year later he stepped up to the Škoda Octavia Cup, finishing the year 13th in the standings.

In 2002, he made his single–seater debut in the Formula BMW ADAC series in Germany. In his first season in the category he was classified in 21st place. The following year he improved to 13th overall, taking a podium place in the final round at Hockenheim.

Formula Three
In 2004, Salaquarda graduated to Formula Three, racing in the German championship with the family ISR Racing team. He finished the season in 11th place with 42 points. 2005 saw him move up to the Formula 3 Euro Series, the first of three seasons in the category. He failed to score a point in his first two seasons, whilst in 2007 a switch to HBR Motorsport saw him score three points.

In 2005, he contested the famous end–of–season Macau Grand Prix whilst in 2006 and 2007 he also took part in the Masters of Formula 3 non–championship races.

F3000 International Masters
In June 2006, Salaquarda made an appearance at the Oschersleben round of the F3000 International Masters season. Driving for the Charouz Racing System team, he finished both races in second place. Despite only taking part in those two races, he scored enough points to finish 12th in the standings.

A1 Grand Prix
In April 2007, Salaquarda made his A1 Grand Prix debut for A1 Team Czech Republic in Shanghai, taking over the seat from Jaroslav Janiš. After finishing 17th in the sprint race he took the final points–paying position in the main event by finishing tenth. The following season, Salaquarda took part in the final six races of the campaign, taking a best race result of 11th place, also in Shanghai.

International Formula Master
Towards the end of 2007, Salaquarda took part in the final round of the International Formula Master season at Monza with ISR Racing. The following year he took part in a full season in the series, taking a best result of sixth in the opening race of the year at Valencia to finish in 24th position.

Le Mans Series
In May 2009, Salaquarda made a one–off appearance in the Le Mans Series, taking part in the Spa–Francorchamps 1000km event. He was entered in the GT1 class for IPB Spartak Racing, racing alongside Peter Kox and countryman Erik Janiš. They finished the race second in class, behind the winning Luc Alphand Aventures Chevrolet Corvette C6.R, and 15th overall.

Formula Renault 3.5 Series
Later the same month, Salaquarda made his debut in the Formula Renault 3.5 Series, joining the RC Motorsport team at the third round of the season in Monaco. After the race, in which he finished 21st, he left the team to join Prema Powerteam, who he remained with for the rest of the season. His best race result came in the sprint event at Portimão, where he finished in tenth place. He finished the season in 27th place overall.

Salaquarda continued in the series in 2010, competing for ISR Racing who took over the entry of RC Motorsport. He finished the season classified in 11th place, taking a double–pole position at his home round in Brno and podium places at Brno and Magny–Cours.

Other series
In 2008, Salaquarda originally signed to race for Brooks Associates Racing in the Atlantic Championship in the United States, but the deal fell through at the last minute when the driver funding fell through 

Salaquarda also made his GP2 test debut in October 2009, driving two days for Trident Racing at the Jerez circuit in Spain.

Racing record

Career summary

† – Team standings.

Complete Formula 3 Euro Series results
(key) (Races in bold indicate pole position) (Races in italics indicate fastest lap)

† Driver did not finish the race, but was classified as he completed over 90% of the race distance.

Complete A1 Grand Prix results
(key) (Races in bold indicate pole position) (Races in italics indicate fastest lap)

Complete Formula Renault 3.5 Series results
(key) (Races in bold indicate pole position) (Races in italics indicate fastest lap)

Complete Superleague Formula results
(key) (Races in bold indicate pole position) (Races in italics indicate fastest lap)

FIA GT competition results

GT1 World Championship results

FIA GT Series results

Complete Blancpain GT Series Sprint Cup results

References

External  links

 
 

1984 births
Living people
Sportspeople from Prague
Czech racing drivers
German Formula Three Championship drivers
Formula 3 Euro Series drivers
A1 Team Czech Republic drivers
International Formula Master drivers
Formula BMW ADAC drivers
European Le Mans Series drivers
World Series Formula V8 3.5 drivers
FIA GT1 World Championship drivers
Blancpain Endurance Series drivers
International GT Open drivers
24 Hours of Spa drivers
Prema Powerteam drivers
Bhaitech drivers
ISR Racing drivers
A1 Grand Prix drivers
Charouz Racing System drivers
RC Motorsport drivers
Pons Racing drivers
AF Corse drivers
Audi Sport drivers
Mücke Motorsport drivers
ADAC GT Masters drivers